The 1973 Miami Hurricanes football team represented the University of Miami as an independent during the 1973 NCAA Division I football season. Led by first-year head coach Pete Elliott, the Hurricanes played their home games at the Miami Orange Bowl in Miami, Florida. Miami finished the season with a record of 5–6.

Schedule

Personnel

Season summary

Texas

References

Miami
Miami Hurricanes football seasons
Miami Hurricanes football